Savindu Peiris (born 16 October 1998) is a Sri Lankan cricketer. He made his first-class debut for Sri Lanka Navy Sports Club in Tier B of the 2018–19 Premier League Tournament on 22 March 2019.

References

External links
 

1998 births
Living people
Sri Lankan cricketers
Sri Lanka Navy Sports Club cricketers
Sportspeople from Moratuwa